George Sharswood (July 7, 1810 – May 28, 1883) was a Pennsylvania jurist and Chief Justice of the Supreme Court of Pennsylvania. He was also the Dean of the University of Pennsylvania Law School.

Biography
Sharswood was born in Philadelphia, Pennsylvania on July 7, 1810. He graduated with honors from the University of Pennsylvania in 1828. On September 5, 1831, he was admitted to the bar of the Commonwealth of Pennsylvania.

He served as a member of the Pennsylvania House of Representatives in 1837, and was a district judge in Pennsylvania from 1845 to 1867.

In 1850, he became a Professor of Law at and reorganized the University of Pennsylvania Law School, where he served for 18 years. He was Dean of the Law School from 1852 to 1868.  He was senior professor of law there until 1867, when he resigned his chair.

In 1851, he was elected as a member to the American Philosophical Society.

During his tenure he was a respected author, editor and commentator.   In 1859, then Professor George Sharswood published through Childs and Peterson in Philadelphia a two-volume edition of Blackstone's Commentaries which weeded and gleaned the notes and commentaries of the prior English editors and added a treasure trove of new notes and observations on the application or divergence of the various sections of the Commentaries in America from the founding of the country to the Civil War, collecting American cases and references to Kent's Commentaries to illustrate his observations. This effort continued in subsequent editions after he became an Associate Justice, at least through the publication of an 1872 edition by Lippincott & Co. in 1872.

He was appointed to the Supreme Court of Pennsylvania in 1868, and was named Chief Justice in the court in 1879. He retired in 1882.

Death and interment
Sharswood died on May 28, 1883, and was buried in Philadelphia's Laurel Hill Cemetery, Section R, Plots L501 & 503.

Sources
 Penn Law School
 Biography of George Sharswood by Samuel Dickson

References

External links
Portrait at the University of Pennsylvania
Three volumes of handwritten letters from George Sharswood to his children, George and Jane, while the latter were on a tour of Europe, 1875-1876. The University of Texas at San Antonio Libraries Special Collections
 
 

1810 births
1883 deaths
Politicians from Philadelphia
Justices of the Supreme Court of Pennsylvania
Pennsylvania lawyers
Pennsylvania state court judges
American Presbyterians
Members of the Pennsylvania House of Representatives
Chief Justices of Pennsylvania
Deans of University of Pennsylvania Law School
Burials at Laurel Hill Cemetery (Philadelphia)
19th-century American politicians
19th-century American judges
19th-century American lawyers